Pachystyla is a genus of small air-breathing land snails, terrestrial pulmonate gastropod mollusks in the family Helicarionidae.

Distribution
These terrestrial species occur in Mauritius.

Species 
Species within the genus Pachystyla include:
 Pachystyla bicolor (Lamarck, 1822)
 Pachystyla rufozonata (H. Adams, 1869)
 Pachystyla waynepagei Griffiths, 2000
Species brought into synonymy
 Pachystyla inversicolor (Férussac, 1822): synonym of Pachystyla bicolor (Lamarck, 1822)
 Pachystyla leucostyla (L. Pfeiffer, 1855): synonym of Pachystyla bicolor (Lamarck, 1822)
 Pachystyla scalpta E. von Martens, 1878: synonym of Dancea semifusca (Deshayes, 1832) (junior synonym)

References

 Morelet, A., 1851. Testacea Africae insularis a Cl. Vesco collecta et ab Morelet descripta. Revue et Magasin de Zoologie Pure et Appliquée (2)3: 218-221
 Bank, R. A. (2017). Classification of the Recent terrestrial Gastropoda of the World. Last update: July 16th, 2017

External links
 Nomenclator Zoologicus info
 Mörch, O. A. L. (1852-1853). Catalogus conchyliorum quae reliquit D. Alphonso d'Aguirra & Gadea Comes de Yoldi, Regis Daniae Cubiculariorum Princeps, Ordinis Dannebrogici in Prima Classe & Ordinis Caroli Tertii Eques. Fasc. 1, Cephalophora, 170 pp

 
Helicarionidae